Charles Mathieu Schols (28 March 1849, in Maastricht – 17 March 1897, in Delft) was a Dutch surveyor, mathematician and pioneer of geodesy.  He was elected a member of the Royal Netherlands Academy of Arts and Sciences.

References

1849 births
1897 deaths
Dutch surveyors
People from Maastricht
Delft University of Technology alumni
Academic staff of the Delft University of Technology
Members of the Royal Netherlands Academy of Arts and Sciences